The priority of the Gospel of Marcion or Marcionite priority (or priority of the Marcionite Gospel) is a possible solution to the synoptic problem. This hypothesis claims that the first produced or compiled gospel was that of Marcion and that this gospel of Marcion was used as inspiration for some, or all, of the canonical gospels: Matthew, Mark, Luke, and John. A contemporary proponent of this hypothesis is Matthias Klinghardt.

Context 

Marcion of Sinope ( 85 – c. 160) is the founder of a Christian movement called Marcionism. Marcion is regarded by numerous scholars as having produced the first New Testament canon. He also wrote a gospel, or adopted a preexisting one, called the Evangelion, now commonly called the Gospel of Marcion.

Church Fathers say Marcion wrote the gospel of Marcion himself, and that the gospel of Marcion is a revision of the gospel of Luke with some passages expurged from it to fit Marcion's theology; this hypothesis on the relationship between the gospels of Marcion and of Luke is called the patristic hypothesis. However, this is not the only hypothesis. Some argue that the gospel of Marcion precedes the gospel of Luke and that the gospel of Luke is a revision of the Gospel of Marcion (Schwegler hypothesis). Others argue that the gospel of Marcion and the gospel of Luke are two independent versions of a common source, and that the gospel of Marcion is an unaltered version of this source or is more faithful to this source than the gospel of Luke is (Semler hypothesis). Others go further and consider that the Gospel of Marcion was the very first gospel ever produced, preceding all others including the gospels of Matthew, Mark, Luke, and John (Marcion hypothesis).

"[T]here has been a long line of scholars" who, against what the Church Fathers said, claimed "that our canonical Luke forms an enlarged version of a 'Proto-Luke' which was also used by Marcion. This dispute [...] was especially vivid in nineteenth century German scholarship". In 1942, John Knox published his Marcion and the New Testament, defending that the gospel of Marcion had the chronological priority over Luke. After this publication, no defense of this theory was made again until two 2006 articles: one of Joseph Tyson, and one of Matthias Klinghardt. "Knox and Tyson believe that Marcion used and falsified 'Proto-Luke, while Klinghardt, who at that time did not defend that the gospel of Marcion was the very first gospel ever produced, "assert[ed] that Marcion used Proto-Luke as he found it, that is, Marcion's Gospel and 'Proto-Luke' are identical".

Gospel of Marcion as the first of all gospels 

In his 2013 book, The First New Testament: Marcion's Scriptural Canon, Jason BeDuhn considers that the gospel of Marcion was not produced or adapted by Marcion, but instead that the Gospel of Marcion was a preexisting gospel adopted by Marcion and his movement. He believes that: "On the whole, the differences between Luke and the Evangelion [i.e. the Gospel of Marcion] resist explanation on ideological grounds, and point instead toward Semler's original suggestion 250 years ago: the two gospels could be alternative versions adapted for primarily Jewish and primarily Gentile readers, respectively. In other words, the differences served practical, mission-related purposes rather than ideological, sectarian ones. Under such a scenario, the Evangelion would be transmitted within exactly the wing of emerging Christianity in which we can best situate Marcion’s own religious background". Semler's hypothesis being that "the Evangelion and Luke are both pre-Marcionite versions going back to a common original".

In his 2014 book Marcion and the Dating of the Synoptic Gospels, Markus Vinzent considers that the gospel of Marcion precedes the four gospels (Matthew, Mark, Luke, and John). He believes that the Gospel of Marcion influenced the four gospels. Vinzent differs with both BeDuhn and Klinghardt in that he believes the Gospel of Marcion was written directly by Marcion: Marcion's gospel was first written as a draft "probably for his class-room (without Antitheses and perhaps without Paul's letters). This text provided the basis for Matthew and John and Mark and Luke". Marcion's draft was not meant for publication, and was plagiarized by the four canonical gospels; this plagiarism angered Marcion who saw the purpose of his text distorted and made him publish his gospel, along with the Antitheses as a preface and 10 letters of Paul.

In his 2015 book, Matthias Klinghardt changed his mind comparing to his 2008 opinion. In a 2008 article he said that Marcion's gospel was based on the Gospel of Mark, that the Gospel of Matthew was an expansion of the Gospel of Mark with reference to the Gospel of Marcion, and that the Gospel of Luke was an expansion of the Gospel of Marcion with reference to the Gospels of Matthew and Mark. In his 2015 book, Klingardht shares the same opinion as BeDuhn and Vinzent on the priority and influence of the Gospel of Marcion, as well as on its adoption by Marcion. He considers that the Gospel of Marcion preceded and influenced the four gospels (Matthew, Mark, Luke, and John). Klinghardt and BeDuhn reaffirmed their opinions in two 2017 articles.

The Marcion priority also implies a model of the late dating of the New Testament Gospels to the 2nd century – a thesis that goes back to David Trobisch, who, in 1996 in his habilitation thesis accepted in Heidelberg, presented the conception or thesis of an early, uniform final editing of the New Testament canon in the 2nd century.

Criticism

Christopher Hays contends that Klinghart's 2006 case makes a number of philological errors, misunderstands the nature of how Marcion is contended to have redacted Luke, and offers an inconsistent case on how he views that Luke had redacted Marcion. For example, while one argument for Marcionite priority over Luke rests on the claim that it is unlikely that Marcion deleted significant portions of Luke rather than Luke having expanded significant portions of Marcion, Hays holds that Marcion also deleted significant portions of Paul's letters to create his Apostolikon. Thus, Hays sees it as special pleading to acknowledge that Marcion edited down Paul and to also hold that Marcion did not edit down Luke. In addition, Moll says that all surviving sources say that Marcion is the one who edited Luke, and therefore the burden of proof is on advocates of Marcionite priority to provide the counter-argument.

Dieter Roth has responded to Markus Vinzent's thesis (that Marcion was the author of the first Gospel and that the four canonical Gospels only came after it). According to Roth, Vinzent advances this thesis based on a number of misreadings of Tertullian.

Notes

See also 
Farrer hypothesis
Gospel of Marcion
Griesbach hypothesis
Markan priority
Synoptic problem
Two-source hypothesis

References

Further reading 

 BeDuhn, Jason (2013) The First New Testament: Marion's Scriptural Canon
 
 
 
 Klinghart, Matthias (2015) Das älteste Evangelium und die Entstehung der kanonischen Evangelien, Francke A. Verlag (in German); translated in English as 
 Klinghardt, Matthias (2018), The Oldest gospel: Klinghardt Edition, Quiet Waters Publications 
 Vinzent, Markus (2014) Marcion and the Dating of the Synoptic Gospels, Studia Patristica, Peeters.

External links 
 Early Christian Writings: Marcion
 The Center for Marcionite Research Library

Synoptic problem
Hypotheses
Biblical criticism
Marcionism